Kushwah is an Indian surname. Notable persons with this name include:
Ankit Kushwah (born 1992), Indian cricketer
Kunwar Yashwantsingh Kushwah, Indian politician, member of the Madhya Pradesh Legislative Assembly 1957–1962
Narayan Singh Kushwah, Indian politician, member of the Madhya Pradesh Legislative Assembly 2008–present
Vishal Kushwah (born 1990), Indian cricketer
Kushagra Kushwah (born 2006), upcoming Nit'n